Helena Růžičková (13 June 1936 in Prague – 4 January 2004 in Plzeň) was a Czech actress. Above all, Helena Růžičková was known for her comedic talents, and for films produced in the Czech Republic and East Germany. She became popular especially thanks to her roles in Jaroslav Papoušek's comedy trilogy about the Homolka family (1969-1972), and in another comedy trilogy Slunce, seno...(1984-1991) directed by Zdeněk Troška.

Her son, Jiří Růžička, was also an actor until his death in 1999. Růžičková herself died of stomach cancer on 4 January 2004 in a hospital in Pilsen. However, director Zdeněk Troška, her close friend, reported in a TV documentary about her life (2010) that her fight with cancer was successful and the real cause of death was kidney failure.

Selected filmography
 Judgement Day (1949)
 Happy End (1966)
 Behold Homolka (1970)
 Tři oříšky pro Popelku (1973)
 Slunce, seno, jahody (1984)
 Princess Jasnenka and the Flying Shoemaker (1987)
 Slunce, seno a pár facek (1989)
 Slunce, seno, erotika (1991)

External links

References

1936 births
2004 deaths
Deaths from stomach cancer
Czech film actresses
Actresses from Prague
Deaths from cancer in the Czech Republic
20th-century Czech actresses